NMGC may refer to:
 Nanoporous Materials Genome Center, developed under the Materials Genome initiative, a materials sciences lab at the University of Minnesota sponsored by the US DOE to study microporous and mesoporous materials for computer design
 National Multicultural Greek Council, a trade association of US-based multicultural fraternities and sororities, founded in 1998
 Nehru Memorial Government College, Hansi, a college located in Hansi in the Indian state of Haryana
 NeoMagic, a software company, traded over-the-counter as NMGC
 New Mexico Gas Company (NMGC), a subsidiary of Emera, a North American provider of natural gas